Sichuan Science and Technology Museum is a museum about science and technology in Sichuan. It was the Sichuan Provincial Exhibition Hall (SCPEH) until 2006. The museum includes airplanes, flying saucers, 3D movies, robots and interactive model rockets.

References

External links
10 page Chengdu Time review

Museums in Sichuan
Science museums in China